Harvey Milton Patt (August 2, 1918 – November 4, 1982) was an American physiologist, radiation biologist, and cell biologist, who made "important scientific contributions in cell cycle kinetics and tissue repopulation."

Education and career
Patt received in 1942 his Ph.D. in physiology from the University of Chicago. His dissertation is titled The relation of a low blood calcium to parathyroid secretion.
 He was an instructor in physiology at the University of Chicago after serving for two years as a lieutenant J.G. in the United States Navy.

At Argonne National Laboratory, Patt became a staff member in 1946 and a senior physiologist in 1952. He was the executive secretary of the Oberlin Conference on Radiobiology, which was held from June 14 to June 18, 1950 and was sponsored by the National Research Council of the National Academy of Sciences. The conference dealt with "4 aspects of radiobiological interest, namely the physical, chemical, biochemical, and organismal, with the visible cellular effects included in the latter." He was an important pioneer of the field of radiobiology. As a member of the Radiation Research Society, he was the first treasurer, the ninth president, and an editorial board member of the journal Radiation Research, as well as the executive secretary of the First International Congress of Radiation Research; the congress was held in Burlington, Vermont from the 11th to the 15th of August, 1958.

At the University of California, San Francisco (UCSF), Patt was appointed in 1964 the director of the Laboratory of Radiobiology and a professor of radiobiology and experimental radiology. As the successor to Robert Spencer Stone (1895–1966), he developed the program with format still used at UCSF.

In 1964 Patt was awarded the Ernest Orlando Lawrence Award from the Atomic Energy Commission "for exceptionally high quality research in radiobiology, especially in the field of radiation protection and for his important contributions to the present understanding of the dynamics of white blood cells formation." In February 1964 at UCSF, Mortimer J. Elkind gave the inaugural Harvey M. Patt Memorial Lecture; after the lecture a plaque in memory of Patt was dedicated at UCSF's Laboratory of Radiobiology and Environmental Health.

Selected publications
  (Arno B. Luckhardt (1885–1957) was a professor of physiology at the University of Chicago.)
  (Marguerite N. Swift was a physiologist who worked on the Manhattan Project. She was one of the seventy signers of the Szilárd petition.)
 
  (over 950 citations)
 
 
 
 
  1954
 
  (Peeyush Lala won the 2020 Henry Gray Award from the American Association for Anatomy.)

References

External links
 
 

1918 births
1982 deaths
American physiologists
Cell biologists
Radiobiologists
Radiation health effects researchers
University of Chicago alumni
Argonne National Laboratory people
University of California, San Francisco faculty